TAF5-like RNA polymerase II p300/CBP-associated factor-associated factor 65 kDa subunit 5L is an enzyme that in humans is encoded by the TAF5L gene.

Function 

The product of this gene belongs to the WD-repeat TAF5 family of proteins. This gene encodes a protein that is a component of the PCAF histone acetylase complex. The PCAF histone acetylase complex, which is composed of more than 20 polypeptides some of which are TAFs, is required for myogenic transcription and differentiation. TAFs may participate in basal transcription, serve as coactivators, function in promoter recognition or modify general transcription factors to facilitate complex assembly and transcription initiation. The encoded protein is structurally similar to one of the histone-like TAFs, TAF5. Alternatively spliced transcript variants encoding different isoforms have been identified for this gene.

Interactions 

TAF5L has been shown to interact with TAF9 and Transcription initiation protein SPT3 homolog.

References

Further reading